Orient Bay may refer to:

Orient Bay, Saint Martin
Orient Bay, a community in Greenstone, Ontario, Canada